The Scotland national shinty team is the team selected to represent Scotland and the sport of shinty in the annual composite rules Shinty/Hurling International Series against the Ireland national hurling team.  The team is selected by the Camanachd Association.

As well as the men's senior team currently headed by coach Ronald Ross, a men's under-21 team and women's team also competes against equivalent Irish sides each year.

Notable former players
 John Barr 
 Gary Innes 
 Stuart MacKintosh
 Niall MacPhee
 Finlay MacRae
 Ronald Ross 
 Eddie Tembo
 Hector Whitelaw

References

Shinty
Shinty